Pseudomonarchia Daemonum, or False Monarchy of Demons, first appears as an Appendix to  De praestigiis daemonum (1577) by Johann Weyer. An abridgment of a grimoire similar in nature to the Ars Goetia (first book of The Lesser Key of Solomon), it contains a list of demons, and the appropriate hours and rituals to conjure them.

The Pseudomonarchia predates, and differs somewhat from, Ars Goetia. The Pseudomonarchia lists sixty-nine demons (in contrast to the later seventy-two), and their sequence varies, along with some of their characteristics.  The demon Pruflas appears only in Pseudomonarchia, and Pseudomonarchia does not attribute any sigils to the demons.

Weyer referred to his source manuscript as Liber officiorum spirituum, seu Liber dictus Empto.  Salomonis, de principibus et regibus daemoniorum. (Book of the offices of spirits, or the book called 'Empto'. Solomon, concerning the princes and kings of demons.)  This work is likely related to a very similar 1583 manuscript titled The Office of Spirits, both of which appear ultimately be an elaboration on a fifteenth-century manuscript titled Le Livre des Esperitz (of which 30 of its 47 spirits are nearly identical to spirits in the Ars Goetia).

The 69 demons

 King Baël
 Duke Aguarès
 President Barbas
 Prince/Duke Pruflas
 Marquess Amon
 Duke/Count Barbatos
 President Buer
 Duke Gusoyn
 Count/President Botis
 Duke Bathym
 King Pursan
 Duke Eligos
 Marquess Loray
 Duke Valefor
 Count/President Morax
 Prince/Count Ipes
 President Glasya labolas
 Marquess Naberius
 Duke Zepar
 King Byleth
 Prince Sytry
 King Paimon
 King Bélial
 Duke Bune
 Marquess Forneus
 Marquess/Count Roneve
 Duke Berith
 Duke Astaroth
 President Forras
 Count Furfur
 Marquess Marchocias
 President Malphas
 Duke Vepar
 Marquess Sabnac
 King Sidonay
 Prince/President Gaap
 Duke/Marquess Chax
 Duke Pucel
 Knight Furcas
 Duke/Count Murmur
 President Caym
 Count Raum
 Count Halphas
 Duke Focalor
 King/Count Vine
 Count Bifrons
 Marquess Samigina
 King/President Zagan
 Marquess Orias
 President Volac
 Duke Gomory
 King/Count Decarabia
 Duke Amduscias
 Marquess Andras
 Marquess Andrealphus
 President Oze
 Duke Aym
 Prince Orobas
 Duke Vapula
 Marquess Cimeries
 President Amy
 Duke Flauros
 King Balam
 Duke Alocer
 Count Saleos
 Duke Vuall
 President Haagenti
 Marquess Phoenix
 Prince Stolas

See also
 List of demons in the Ars Goetia

Notes

References

External links 
Pseudomonarchia Daemonum

1577 books
Demonological literature
Goetia
 Grimoires